Klemperer is a German-language occupational surname literally meaning "tinker".  It is suggested that in the case of the conductor's immediate family the original name was Klopper - one who knocks on doors to get people to go to Synagogue - and was later changed to the better sounding Klemperer which rhymes with Emperor.

The surname may refer to:

 Members of the prominent German family:
 Otto Klemperer (1885–1973), Jewish German-born conductor and composer
 Johanna Klemperer, his wife, known professionally as Johanna Geisler
 Werner Klemperer (1920–2000), German-American actor, their son, best known for playing Colonel Klink in Hogan's Heroes, and musician
 Georg Klemperer (1865–1946), Jewish German medical consultant, brother of Victor and cousin to the conductor Otto Klemperer, advised his cousin in America concerning his brain tumour.
 Victor Klemperer (1881–1960), Jewish German businessman, journalist, author and literary critic (Professor of Literature)
Otto Klemperer (physicist) (1899–1987), German physicist and cousin to the conductor Otto Klemperer
 David Klemperer (born 1980), German beach volleyball player
 Felix Klemperer (1866–1932), German internist 
 Gustav Klemperer von Klemenau (1852–1926), German banker
 James von Klemperer (born 1957), American architect
 Klemens von Klemperer (1916–2012), German-American historian
 Paul Klemperer (born 1956), English economist and Edgeworth Professor of Economics at Oxford University
 Ralph von Klemperer, German banker
 Simon Klemperer, Geophysicist and Stanford University professor, brother of Paul Klemperer
 Viktor Klemperer von Klemenau (1876–1943), German banker
 Wilhelm Klemperer (1839–1912), Rabbi
 William Klemperer (1927–2017), American chemist and Harvard University professor
 Wolfgang Klemperer (1893–1965), German-American physicist and aerospace engineer

See also 
 134348 Klemperer, a main-belt asteroid
 Klemperer – Ein Leben in Deutschland, a German TV series

Jewish surnames
German-language surnames
Occupational surnames